Louis Dennis Varland (born December 9, 1997) is an American professional baseball pitcher for the Minnesota Twins of Major League Baseball (MLB).

Career
Varland attended North High School in North St. Paul, Minnesota and played college baseball at the Concordia University, St. Paul. He was drafted by the Minnesota Twins in the 15th round of the 2019 Major League Baseball draft.

Varland made his professional debut with the Elizabethton Twins. He did not play for a team in 2020, due to the Minor League Baseball season being cancelled because of the COVID-19 pandemic. He returned in 2021 to pitch for the Fort Myers Mighty Mussels and Cedar Rapids Kernels. He was named the Twins minor league pitcher of the year after going 10–4 with a 2.10 earned run average (ERA) and 142 strikeouts. Varland started 2022 with the Wichita Wind Surge. He made his major league debut with the Twins on September 7.

Personal life
His brother, Gus, pitches in the Milwaukee Brewers organization.

References

External links

Living people
1997 births
Baseball players from Saint Paul, Minnesota
Major League Baseball pitchers
Minnesota Twins players
Concordia Golden Bears baseball players
Utica Blue Sox players
Elizabethton Twins players
Fort Myers Mighty Mussels players
Cedar Rapids Kernels players
Wichita Wind Surge players
St. Paul Saints players